The 1983–84 NCAA Division II men's ice hockey season began in November 1983 and concluded on March 18 of the following year. This was the 20th season of second-tier college ice hockey.

The majority of programs that had been playing at the Division II level came from Division III schools but continued to play at a higher level because the NCAA did not hold a National Division III Tournament. That changed for the 1983–84 season and with the institution of the new championship all of the Division III schools dropped down to their normal level. This left scant few teams at the Division II level and when it became apparent that the NCAA could not hold a national tournament for so few programs they decided to shutter the D-II championship after the 1984 playoff.

As a swan song for the Division II level, Bemidji State produced only the second undefeated championship season in NCAA history (the other being Cornell in 1970).

Regular season

Season tournaments

Standings

1984 NCAA Tournament

Note: * denotes overtime period(s)

See also
 1983–84 NCAA Division I men's ice hockey season
 1983–84 NCAA Division III men's ice hockey season

References

External links

 
NCAA